Emanuel V. Soriano (born December 30, 1936) was the 14th president of the University of the Philippines. He was one of the pioneer faculty members of the College of Business Administration, and among the first Filipinos to be sent to the United States for advanced studies in business like former College of Business Administration deans Jaime C. Laya (who was the 5th Governor of the Central Bank of the Philippines from 1981 to 1984), Magdaleno B. Albarracin, Jr. (now member of the Board of Regents), and Rafael A. Rodriguez (now Professor Emeritus).

Formerly a longtime supporter of President Ferdinand Marcos, Soriano wrote an "open letter" published in Manila's Business Day newspaper on September 5, 1983.  He called for Marcos to resign in the wake of the assassination of opposition leader Benigno Aquino Jr. while in military custody and questioned the impartiality of the commission investigating the slaying.

He served as the National Security Adviser to President Corazon Aquino from 1987 to 1989. He was one of the opposition leaders from 1983 to 1986 and was a prime mover of the Convenors Group that was instrumental in paving the way for the selection of Cory Aquino as the opposition candidate against Marcos in the 1985–1986 Snap Elections.

 He also served as a faculty member of the Asian Institute of Management until 1996.

He earned his B.S. in mechanical engineering and Master in Industrial Management degrees from the University of the Philippines, and his Doctor of Business Administration (DBA) degree from Harvard Business School.

Personal life
One of his first cousins was Bro. Eli Soriano, who was the overall servant (presiding minister) of the Members Church of God International until his death in February 2021.

References

1936 births
Harvard Business School alumni
University of the Philippines alumni
Living people
People from Cebu City
Academic staff of the University of the Philippines
National Security Advisers of the Philippines
Corazon Aquino administration cabinet members
Academic staff of the Asian Institute of Management
Presidents of universities and colleges in the Philippines